

This list of African American Historic Places in Missouri is based on a book by the National Park Service, The Preservation Press, the National Trust for Historic Preservation, and the National Conference of State Historic Preservation Officers.

Some of these sites are on the National Register of Historic Places (NR) as independent sites or as part of larger historic district. Several of the sites are National Historic Landmarks (NRL). Others have Missouri historical markers (HM). The citation on historical markers is given in the reference. The location listed is the nearest community to the site. More precise locations are given in the reference.

Boone County

Columbia
 Frederick Douglass High School,
 John W. Boone House,
 St. Paul AME Church,
 Second Baptist Church,
 Second Christian Church,

Cooper County
 Boonville
 St. Matthew's Chapel AME Church
 Sumner Public School

Franklin County
 New Haven
 AME Church of New Haven
 St. Charles African Church

Jackson County

 Kansas City
 18th and Vine Historic District
 Attucks School
 Paseo YMCA
 Santa Fe Place Historic District
 Negro Leagues Baseball Museum

Lewis County
 Canton
 Lincoln School
 Jefferson City
 Jefferson City Community Center
 Lincoln Univ. Hilltop Campus Historic District

Marion County
 Hannibal
Eighth and Center Streets Baptist Church

Newton County
 
 Diamond
 George Washington Carver National Monument

City of St. Louis
 St. Louis
 Charles Sumner High School
 First African Baptist Church (St. Louis, Missouri)
 Gateway Arch National Park
 Homer G. Phillips Hospital
 Mary Meachum Freedom Crossing
 Mutual Musicians' Foundation Building
 Negro Masonic Hall
 Quinn Chapel AME Church
 Scott Joplin House
 Shelley House
 Washington Park Cemetery

Saline County
 Marshall
 Free Will Baptist Church of Pennytown,

References

African-American history of Missouri
Missouri geography-related lists
History of Missouri
Missouri
Historic sites in Missouri
Missouri history-related lists